Apotek 1 Gruppen AS is a Norwegian pharmacy wholesaler (Apokjeden Distribusjon AS) and retailer (Apotek 1) owned by German Phoenix Pharmahandel. It owns the largest pharmacy chain in Norway, Apotek 1. The company started a cooperation with a number of pharmacists who wanted a wholesaler independent of the state owned Norsk Medisinaldepot in 1995, when most pharmacies in the country joined the company. 1997 saw the first attempts to brand the pharmacies, as Plussapotek. The first branded pharmacy as Apotek 1 was launched in 1999 in Manglerud Senter. In 2001, the pharmacy market was deregulated, and Tamro was at first chosen as a wholesaler, before eventually buying the entire company in 2004.

Wholesalers of Norway
Companies based in Oslo
Retail companies established in 1995